The Stillman Parker House is a historic house at 484 Summer Avenue in Reading, Massachusetts.  Probably built in the 1850s, it is a rare local variant of transitional Federal/Greek Revival styling.  The -story wood-frame house has a high-pitched roof which extends over the front porch, which is supported by fluted Doric columns.  The doors and windows have Greek Revival architrave surrounds.  The house belonged to Stillman Parker, a local shoe manufacturer who also served on the town's board of selectmen.

The house was listed on the National Register of Historic Places in 1984.

See also
National Register of Historic Places listings in Reading, Massachusetts
National Register of Historic Places listings in Middlesex County, Massachusetts

References

Houses on the National Register of Historic Places in Reading, Massachusetts
Houses in Reading, Massachusetts
1851 establishments in Massachusetts